Goldish is a surname. Notable people with the surname include:

 Meish Goldish (21st century), American children's writer
 Suzanne Goldish (21st century), American voice actress